Swansea City Association Football Club is a professional football club based in Swansea, Wales that plays in the Championship, the second tier of English football. Swansea have played their home matches at the Swansea.com Stadium (formerly known as the Liberty Stadium) since 2005, having previously played at the Vetch Field since the club was founded.

The club was founded in 1912 as Swansea Town and entered into the Southern League, winning the Welsh Cup in their debut season. They were admitted into the Football League in 1920 and won the Third Division South title in 1924–25. They again won the Third Division South title in 1948–49, having been relegated two years previously. They fell into the Fourth Division after relegations in 1965 and 1967. The club changed their name to Swansea City in 1969 to reflect Swansea's new status as a city. They were promoted at the end of the 1969–70 season.

The club won three promotions in four seasons to reach the First Division in 1981. It was during the following season they came close to winning the league title, but a decline then set in near the season's end, before they finished sixth, still a club record. It was from here the club suffered a relegation the season after, returning to the Fourth Division by 1986 and then narrowly avoiding relegation to the Conference in 2003. The Swansea City Supporters Trust Ltd owns 20% of the club, with their involvement hailed by Supporters Direct as "the most high profile example of the involvement of a supporters' trust in the direct running of a club". The club's subsequent climb from the fourth division of English football to the top division is chronicled in the 2014 film, Jack to a King – The Swansea Story.

In 2011, Swansea were promoted to the Premier League. On 24 February 2013, Swansea beat Bradford City 5–0 to win the 2012–13 Football League Cup (the competition's highest ever winning margin for the final), winning the first major trophy in the club's history and qualifying for the 2013–14 UEFA Europa League, in which they reached the round of 32 but lost over two legs to Napoli. The club was relegated from the Premier League at the end of the 2017–18 season.

History

Early years (1912–1945)
The area around Swansea traditionally had been a rugby area, and despite previous attempts by a football club named Swansea Villa, there were no notable football clubs until the establishment of 'Swansea Town AFC' in the summer of 1912. Following the lead of many other South Wales sides, the club joined the Second Division of the Southern League for the following season. J. W. Thorpe was the club's first chairman. A site owned by Swansea Gaslight Co., called Vetch Field due to the vegetables that grew there, was rented to be the club's ground.

The club's first professional match was a 1–1 draw at the Vetch Field against Cardiff City on 7 September 1912. During that first season the Welsh Cup was won for the first time. The Swans beat reigning English champions Blackburn Rovers 1–0 in the first round of the 1914–15 FA Cup, Swansea's goal coming from Ben Beynon.

Following the First World War the Southern League dropped its Second Division, and with many clubs dropping out due to financial difficulties, the Swans were placed in the First Division. After four seasons in the Southern League, Swansea Town became founder members of the new Third Division of The Football League in 1920 and then Division Three (South) the following season.

After five seasons in Division Three (South) and a few failed bids for promotion, the Swans reached the Second Division for the first time in 1925, beating Exeter City 2–1 at home on the final day of the season to win the division. The side had remained unbeaten at home in the league all season – something the next promotion team would emulate over twenty years later. The following season the Swans reached the semi-finals of the FA Cup for the first time, beating Exeter City, Watford, Blackpool, Stoke City, Millwall and Arsenal, before losing 3–0 to eventual cup winners Bolton Wanderers at White Hart Lane. Swans record their highest average attendance during the season of 16,118 for pre-war league games. During the 1926–27 season they beat Real Madrid 3–0 on tour. During the 1931–32 season they finished 1st in the league and won the Welsh Cup after beating Wrexham 2–0 away after a replay.

Post-war (1945–1965)

After just one season back from wartime football, the Swans finished 21st in the Second Division, and thus returned to Division Three (South) for the first time since 1925. The following season was one of consolidation, however in 1948–1949 the Swans stormed their way to winning the division for the second time. Only one point was dropped at home all season as the feat of the 1925 promotion side was emulated, with the side finishing a whole seven points ahead of second placed Reading. Billy McCandless was the manager who led the side to promotion, and in doing so he completed a rare hat-trick of winning the Third Division (South) title with all three South Wales clubs – and without losing a home game with Swansea or Cardiff.

Following promotion, the Swans had another 15 years of Second Division football to look forward to, however despite what successive managers and chairmen were to say, Swansea Town only once during that time looked like they could genuinely challenge for promotion. That came in the 1955–56 season, when a side containing the likes of Ivor Allchurch, Terry Medwin, Harry Griffiths and Tom Kiley led the table early in the season, before an injury to Kiley, referred to as the linchpin of the side, in mid-November led to a decline in form. He was never adequately replaced, but despite this and the sale of some of the club's best players, the side remained in contention for promotion until the beginning of April. Following a 6–1 win over second placed Leicester City at the Vetch Field at the end of March the side was just two points behind second placed Liverpool with a game in hand – however subsequent results were not as encouraging, and they eventually slipped away to finish tenth.

In 1964, the Swans reached a second FA Cup semi-final, beating Barrow, Sheffield United and Stoke City en route to a famous sixth round victory at Anfield. Few gave the Swans, struggling for their lives at the bottom of Division Two, any chance of causing an upset against the league leaders. But the Swans were 0–2 up at half-time thanks to Jimmy McLaughlin and Eddie Thomas. Liverpool turned up the pressure in the second half, pulling a goal back before being awarded a penalty nine minutes from time. Ronnie Moran had established an excellent record as a penalty taker, but he failed to beat the excellent Noel Dwyer on this occasion. Fellow second division side Preston North End awaited in the semi-final at Villa Park, but despite taking the lead through McLaughlin again, the Swans were to be denied by a second half penalty and a wonder goal from nearly 40 yards.

After flirting with relegation on a few occasions during the previous seasons, the Swans' luck finally ran out a season later in 1965, and they were back in the Third Division.

A downward spiral (1965–1977)
Following relegation, Trevor Morris, who had been manager since 1958, was sacked and Glyn Davies, a former Swansea player, was appointed in his place. Davies re-signed the 36-year-old Ivor Allchurch from Cardiff City, but despite winning the Welsh Cup, the season saw some of the club's heaviest defeats, and the manager only lasted the season. Relegation to Division Four followed in 1967 and Ivor Allchurch retired. The 1967–68 season saw the record attendance of 32,796 at the Vetch Field for an FA Cup Fourth Round match against Arsenal.

A tragedy struck the club on 20 January 1969 when players Roy Evans and Brian Purcell were killed in a car crash on the way to a game.

In 1969, the club name was changed to Swansea City, and Roy Bentley's side celebrated by securing promotion back to the Third Division. A record run of 19 matches unbeaten provided the foundations for a promotion challenge in 1971–72, but an awful run towards the end of the season resulted in a mid-table finish. A poor start the following season, combined with falling attendances, saw Bentley resign, and he was replaced by Harry Gregg. Gregg failed to stop the rot and the club was back in the Fourth Division for 1973–74 season.

A record low crowd of just 1,358 watched the Swans against Northampton Town, and the following season the Swans were forced to apply for re-election to the Football League after a last day defeat at Rochdale condemned them to a 21st-place finish. The application was a success, although by now former player Harry Griffiths had replaced Gregg as manager. Malcolm Struel also took over as chairman, having previously been on the board, and promised a return to former glories, stating that he would not sell the club's best young talent as previous boards had done.

Meteoric rise and equally rapid fall (1977–1986)

Despite promising performances during the first half of the 1977–78 season, Harry Griffiths resigned as Swansea City's manager in February 1978, doubting his own ability to take the club any further. The new manager was former Liverpool, Cardiff City and Wales striker John Toshack. On 1 March 1978, at 28 years old, Toshack became the youngest manager in the Football League, with Griffiths as his assistant. Thus began a remarkable climb from the Fourth Division to the top of the entire league. Despite relinquishing his role as manager before the end of the season, this was Griffiths' team, and the promotion from the Fourth Division was largely his doing. During this season, the Swans' record league win was achieved (8–0 against Hartlepool United). Before promotion was secured, however, Harry Griffiths died of a heart attack on 25 April 1978 before the home game against Scunthorpe United.

A further promotion was achieved next season and the club returned to the Second Division after an absence of 14 years, with Toshack himself coming off the bench to score the winning goal against Chesterfield and thus secure promotion.

After a season of consolidation, Swansea City again challenged for promotion and travelled to Preston North End on 2 May 1981 in the knowledge that victory would assure them a place in the First Division for the first time in the club's history. A 3–1 win guaranteed a third promotion in four seasons and Swansea City joined the footballing elite. The goalscorers on that day at Deepdale were Tommy Craig, Leighton James and Jeremy Charles. The four-year rise from basement to top division is a record in English football, held jointly with Wimbledon F.C. Swansea also won the Welsh Cup that season, qualifying for Europe for the first time since the 1965–66 season.

The 1981–82 season began with the fixture computer handing Swansea a first-day home game against Leeds United, which the club promptly won 5–1 with a hat-trick by debutant Bob Latchford. Swansea had swept from the basement division to the top of the entire Football League in three years. Victories over Liverpool, Manchester United, Arsenal and Tottenham Hotspur followed as the club topped the league on several further occasions. However, injuries to key players took their toll, and the lack of depth in the squad meant that the season ended in sixth-place finish.

Two consecutive relegations followed, and Toshack was sacked. By 1985, the club was battling for its very survival on two fronts. Whilst its creditors lined up a High Court hearing with the aim of liquidating the club, Swansea City had come to rely on a combination of old players and young professionals.

Wound up by court order in December 1985, Swansea City was saved by local businessman Doug Sharpe who took over the running of the club, although the change of ownership was not enough to prevent relegation to the Fourth Division in 1986. Eight years on from the first promotion under Toshack, the club was back where it had started.

In place of strife (1986–1995)
Swansea won promotion from the Fourth Division in 1988 – beating Rotherham United and Torquay United over two legs in the inaugural playoffs. They remained in the league's third tier for the next eight seasons – the longest period of stability the club had seen since the 1940s. Under Terry Yorath and then Frank Burrows, the club managed to stay in the Second Division, reach the playoff semi-finals in 1993 and make their first Wembley Stadium appearance a year later.

Burrows guided the Swans to within 180 minutes of Wembley in 1993 – a run of five wins in the last six league matches (all at home) secured a playoff place, and with five minutes remaining of the first leg of the semi-final against West Bromwich Albion, the Swans were 2–0 up. Andy McFarlane scored an own goal when the ball rebounded off the crossbar then into the net off his knee, and two early goals in the second leg gave the Baggies the advantage, until midfielder Micky Mellon was sent off. Burrows brought on Colin West, but he was sent off minutes later, ending any hopes of a Wembley final.

Although the league campaign the following season did not live up the previous one, mainly due to the sale of key players, Burrows guided the Swans to Wembley for the first time in their history for the final of the Autoglass Trophy. Wins over Plymouth Argyle & Exeter City in the group stage followed by triumphs over Exeter again, Port Vale, Leyton Orient and Wycombe Wanderers over two legs saw the Swans play Huddersfield Town in a final that finished 1–1. The Swans went on to win 3–1 on penalties.

In the following season, the club again reached the semi-finals of the Auto Windscreens Shield, eventually going out to Birmingham City, and an eventful FA Cup run saw them win at Middlesbrough in a third round replay, before going out to Newcastle United at St James' Park.

The 1995–96 season ended with relegation back to the third division after eight years. The Swans were doing fine around Christmas time, but a complete collapse in the second half of the season, including a 7–0 FA Cup defeat at third division Fulham, 4–0 and 5–1 defeats at Blackpool and Oxford United respectively, led to relegation, despite the arrival of Jan Mølby.

The difficult years return (1995–2001)
Relegation in 1996 was accompanied by a club record of being managed by four men in the same season. Kevin Cullis was appointed as manager by a consortium wishing to buy the club. Cullis, whose previous experience was with non-league club Cradley Town youth team. Alarmed at developments at the club, Sharpe invoked a contractual clause to cancel the deal and resumed control himself: Cullis was promptly sacked after just six days.

Cullis's successor was the Dane, Jan Mølby, a former Liverpool player taking his first steps in management. His appointment inevitably prompted comparison with the Toshack era which began nearly 20 years earlier. Despite relegation in 1996, the club reached the final of the 1997 Third Division promotion play-offs but lost to Northampton Town, whose goal came from a re-taken free kick by John Frain in the final minute. Mølby was sacked just weeks into the following season, with Swansea struggling near the foot of the league. After the initial optimism, the Liverpool connection had not caused history to repeat itself.

Alan Cork was appointed as manager, but was dismissed after leading the club to its lowest league finish for 23 years. John Hollins was appointed, and things soon started to improve. In 1999, the club reached the promotion playoffs, only to lose in extra time at Scunthorpe United. The season included a third round FA Cup victory over Premiership opponents West Ham United, whose team included Frank Lampard, Joe Cole, Rio Ferdinand and John Hartson. Swansea thus became the first bottom division team to defeat a Premiership club in the FA Cup since the re-organisation of the league structure in 1992.

The club was promoted in 2000 as Division Three champions, following a championship decider on the final day of the season against second-placed Rotherham United. The side conceded just 32 goals during the 1999–2000 season, largely due to the form of excellent centre-back pairing Jason Smith and Matthew Bound, as well as keeper Roger Freestone. During the season the side set a record of nine consecutive league victories, and, during the same period, seven consecutive clean sheets. Striker Walter Boyd also set an unwanted record of being the fastest substitute ever sent off, when he was red-carded for striking a Darlington player seconds after being brought on and before play had resumed, therefore being officially recorded as zero seconds.

Promotion was secured courtesy of a 3–0 win over Exeter City at a packed Vetch Field. However, the following week's 1–1 draw at Rotherham United, which confirmed Swansea as Division Three Champions, was overshadowed by the death of supporter Terry Coles, who was trampled to death by a police horse in narrow Millmoor Lane before the game.

The team were relegated in May 2001, just 12 months after promotion. Hollins had failed to strengthen the side at all during the summer, and despite a decent start, a 5–1 defeat at big-spending Reading in September led to a slide down the table, and the side won just eight games all season, and only Oxford United finished below them. Relegation seemed certain following a 5–3 defeat at fellow strugglers Luton Town, where Giovanni Savarese scored a hat-trick, however Hollins maintained that the side could stay up, even when 18 points were needed from the final six matches, and for two other teams to pick up no more points.

Last years at Vetch Field and return to League One (2001–2005)

In July 2001, following relegation back to Third Division, the club was sold to managing director Mike Lewis for £1. Lewis subsequently sold on his stake to a consortium of Australian businessmen behind the Brisbane Lions (An Australian Rules Football team that is based in Brisbane) football team, fronted by Tony Petty. Seven players were sacked and eight others saw their contracts terminated. During this period Hollins was sacked after a poor start to the season, and Colin Addison took over as manager. The turmoil led to the creation of the Swansea City supporters' trust, which sought to save the club and ultimately guarantee supporter representation on the club's board.

The Petty group sold its stake in January 2002 after a bitter stand-off with the Mel Nurse consortium, which was supported by the majority of the club's fans. Jim Moore and Mel Griffin, previously rescuers of Hull City, stepped into the breach and persuaded Petty to sell to them (as he had promised to bankrupt the club & make it extinct rather than sell to Nurse). From there Moore became chairman for three weeks giving the "Mel Nurse Consortium" time to organize its finances. Having successfully reorganized the finances of Hull City, both Moore and Griffin were believers in clubs belonging in the hands of local people, and so believing Nurse's group were best for The Swans, subsequently passed the club onto Nurses consortium for the fee of £1. Despite problems off the pitch, Addison's side had managed a mid-table position, but  he was dismissed in early March, and under Nick Cusack the club slumped to a 20th placed-finish. Cusack lasted just eight games into the following season, and was sacked after a 1–0 defeat at league debutants Boston United had put the Swans on the bottom of the Football League for the first time in their 91-year history. He was replaced by Brian Flynn. Swansea City avoided relegation to the Football Conference on the last day of the season, at the expense of Exeter City, a club then vice-chaired by Mike Lewis.

Brian Flynn's side finished 2003–04 10th and reached the fifth round of the FA Cup for the first time in 24 years, eventually losing 2–1 at Tranmere Rovers. Flynn was dismissed and replaced by Kenny Jackett. Jackett lost his first six matches in charge, ending any hope of a play-off place. The following season Jackett recruited a number of new defensive players and set a record of seven consecutive home clean sheets, all victories. The Swans' last season at the Vetch Field saw the club win promotion on the last day of the season, clinching a 3rd-placed finish with a 1–0 win away to Bury. Their last league game at their old ground was a 1–0 win over Shrewsbury Town, with the last game of any sort being a 2–1 win against Wrexham in the final of the 2005 FAW Premier Cup.

Move to Liberty Stadium and return to top flight (2005–2011)

The club moved to the new Liberty Stadium during the summer of 2005. The first competitive game was a 1–0 victory against Tranmere Rovers in August 2005. In their first season back in League One, Swansea, after beating Brentford in the semi-finals, lost on penalties to Barnsley in the final at the Millennium Stadium in Cardiff. That same season, Swansea won the Football League Trophy for the first time since 1994, and the FAW Premier Cup for a second successive year.

In the following season Jackett resigned as manager in mid-season to be replaced by Roberto Martínez. Martínez's arrival saw an improvement in form, but Swansea missed out on the play-offs again. The following season, an 18-game unbeaten run helped them to the League One title. The club amassed a total of 92 points over the course of the season, the highest ever by a Welsh club in the Football League. Five Swansea players were in the PFA Team of the Year, including the division's 29-goal top scorer Jason Scotland. That same season Swansea lost on penalties to Milton Keynes Dons in the area final of the Football League Trophy.

Upon returning to the second tier of English football after 24 years Swansea City finished the 2008–09 season in eighth place, and missed out on the play-offs the following season by a single point. After 63 wins in 126 games for Swansea City, Martínez left for Wigan Athletic on 15 June 2009 with his tenure returning just 26 losses in that time. He was replaced by Portuguese Paulo Sousa. Sousa subsequently left Swansea to take charge at Leicester City on 5 July 2010, lasting just one year and 13 days in South Wales. However, just before the departure of Sousa, on 15 May 2010, Swansea player Besian Idrizaj suffered a heart attack in his native Austria while on international duty. The club retired the number 40 shirt in his memory, and the players wore shirts dedicated to Idrizaj after their victory in the play-off final.

Northern Irishman Brendan Rodgers took charge for the 2010–11 season. He guided the club to a third-placed finish and qualification for the Championship play-offs. After beating Nottingham Forest 3–1 on aggregate in the semi-final they defeated Reading 4–2 in the final at Wembley Stadium, with Scott Sinclair scoring a hat-trick.

Premier League and Europe (2011–2018)

By being promoted to the Premier League for the 2011–12 season, Swansea became the first Welsh team to play in the division since its formation in 1992. Swansea signed Danny Graham from Watford for a then-record fee of £3.5 million. They defeated Arsenal, Liverpool and Manchester City, the eventual champions, at home during the season. Swansea finished their debut Premier League season in 11th, but at the end of the season Brendan Rodgers left to manage Liverpool. He was replaced by Michael Laudrup for the 2012–13 Premier League season, which was the club's centenary season. Laudrup's first league game ended in a 0–5 victory over Queens Park Rangers away at Loftus Road. Swansea then beat West Ham United 3–0 at the Liberty Stadium, with Michu scoring his third goal in two games. This saw Swansea top of the Premier League; it was the first time since October 1981 the team had been at the summit of the top tier.

On 15 October 2012, the club announced a profit of £14.2 million after their first season in the Premier League. On 1 December, Swansea picked up a 0–2 away win against Arsenal, with Michu scoring twice during the last minutes of the game, in Swansea's first win at Arsenal in three decades. Michu ended the season as the club's top scorer in all competitions, with 22 goals.

On 24 February 2013, Swansea beat Bradford City 0–5 in the League Cup final en route to the biggest win in the final of the competition. This triumph, in a record victory, was Swansea's first major piece of silverware and qualified them for the 2013–14 UEFA Europa League. Swansea finished the season in ninth place in the Premier League, improving upon the league standing achieved in the previous season. On 11 July, Swansea paid a club record transfer fee of £12 million to secure the signing of striker Wilfried Bony from Vitesse Arnhem; Bony was the leading goalscorer in the 2012–13 Eredivisie with 31 goals and was named Dutch Player of the Year.

Swansea enjoyed initial success in Europe, beating Spanish side Valencia 3–0 at the Mestalla Stadium in September 2013. On 3 November 2013, Swansea lost the first Welsh derby in the Premier League to Cardiff City following a 1–0 defeat. In February 2014, Laudrup was dismissed from the club, initially thought because of a poor run of form; however later investigation revealed financial impropriety involving Laudrup's agent Bayram Tutumlu. Defender Garry Monk, a Swansea player since 2004, was named as his replacement. In Monk's first game in charge, Swansea beat Cardiff 3–0 at the Liberty Stadium on 8 February 2014. Despite holding Rafael Benítez's Napoli to a 0–0 draw in the first leg of the Europa League Round of 32, Swansea exited the competition after losing 3–1 in the second leg at the Stadio San Paolo on 27 February 2014.

In January 2015, Wilfried Bony was sold to Manchester City for a record sale of £25 million, with add-ons reportedly leading to £28 million. This deal eclipsed the record fee received from Liverpool for Joe Allen at £15 million. At the time of the sale, Bony was the club's top scorer with 34 goals in all competitions, and the Premier League's top scorer for the 2014 calendar year, with 20 goals. Swansea City finished eighth in the Premier League at the end of the 2014–15 season with 56 points, their highest position and points haul for a Premier League season, and second highest finish in the top flight of all time. During the season, they produced league doubles over Arsenal and Manchester United, becoming only the third team in Premier League history to achieve that feat.

On 9 December 2015, manager Garry Monk was sacked after one win in eleven matches. The club, after a period with Alan Curtis as caretaker manager for the third time, chose the Italian former Udinese Calcio coach Francesco Guidolin. During the 2016–17 preseason, Swansea City came under new ownership by an American consortium led by Jason Levien and Steven Kaplan, who bought a controlling interest in the club in July 2016. Chairman Huw Jenkins remained at the club. On 3 October 2016, Guidolin was sacked and replaced by American coach Bob Bradley. The selection of Bradley marked the first time a Premier League club had ever hired an American manager. Bradley himself was sacked after just 85 days in charge; he won only two of his 11 games, conceded 29 goals, and left with a win percentage of just 18.1%.

On 3 January 2017, Bayern Munich assistant manager Paul Clement agreed to take charge of the team, replacing Bradley. Following Clement's arrival, Nigel Gibbs and Claude Makélélé were appointed his assistant coaches and Karl Halabi was appointed Head of Physical Performance. During the remainder of the 2016–17 season, Clement led Swansea to win 26 points from 18 games, securing their survival on 14 May. Only three prior teams had climbed from bottom of the table at Christmas to escape relegation, and only one prior team was able to escape relegation while having three managers during a season.

On 6 November 2017, assistant coach Claude Makélélé left the club to join Belgian side Eupen. He was replaced by long-term Swansea player Leon Britton. A poor first half of the 2017–18 season saw Swansea sitting bottom of the table after 18 league games, which led to Clement being sacked on 20 December 2017, leaving the club four points adrift of safety. Towards the end of his tenure, Clement was criticised by a section of Swansea supporters for playing "boring" and "negative" football, questioning his tactical decisions with the Swans being the lowest scorers in the Premier League at the time of his sacking. He was replaced by Portuguese manager Carlos Carvalhal. Despite consecutive league home wins against Liverpool (1–0), Arsenal (3–1), Burnley (1–0), and West Ham (4–1), Swansea were winless in their last nine league games (losing five) under Carvalhal, leaving them in 18th place on the final day of the season.

During the season, chairman Huw Jenkins and the club's American owners were criticised by Swansea fans and pundits for poor transfer windows and the firing of managers; Alan Shearer blamed the Swansea board for moving away from the style of play found under previous managers Brendan Rodgers and Roberto Martínez.

Return to the Championship (2018–present)
Swansea City were relegated on 13 May 2018, following a 2–1 defeat to already-relegated Stoke City. On 11 June 2018, Graham Potter was announced as the club's new manager, replacing Carvalhal. On 2 February 2019, Huw Jenkins resigned as chairman amid increasing criticism over the club's sale to the American consortium in 2016 and the club's subsequent relegation from the Premier League. He was replaced with Trevor Birch. The first season back in the Championship produced a 10th-place finish, including a quarter-final appearance in the FA Cup. However, Potter left at the end of the season to manage Premier League club Brighton. He was succeeded by former England U17 manager Steve Cooper, with Mike Marsh joining him as his assistant. In September 2019, Cooper was named EFL Championship Manager of The Month, with Swansea City sitting top of the table after an unbeaten first month; this was Swansea's best start to a season in 41 years. On the final day of the season, Swansea beat Reading 4–1 to finish sixth, moving into the play-offs ahead of Nottingham Forest on goal difference, but were later defeated by Brentford in the semi-final second leg.

At the end of the 2020–21 season, Swansea finished 4th in the league and secured a play-off place for a second consecutive season. Swansea progressed to the 2021 EFL Championship play-off Final after defeating Barnsley 2–1 on aggregate, but lost to Brentford at Wembley Stadium. For the 2021–22 season, the club unveiled a modernised version of the original crest to mark the 40th anniversary of the Swans' first promotion to the top flight in 1981. After Steve Cooper left the club, Russell Martin became head coach. Martin spoke with former Swansea boss Graham Potter before accepting the job. He said, "I know the fanbase and what they expect in terms of the modern Swansea Way, that started under Roberto Martínez and continued under Brendan Rodgers and Michael Laudrup. We, as a coaching team, are very much aligned with that. It excites me."

Stadium

Before Swansea Town was established, children would play football on waste ground in which a plant, called "vetch" (a type of legume) was grown. The site was owned by Swansea Gaslight Company in 1912, but was deemed surplus to requirements at the Gas Company. So Swansea Town moved in when they were established in 1912. The ground originally held 12,000, but hit its peak attendance of 32,786 in a 1967 FA cup Fifth Round against Arsenal. The last league goal ever scored at the Vetch was scored by Adrian Forbes, on 30 April 2005, as Swansea beat Shrewsbury Town 1–0.

With a rapidly deteriorating Vetch Field, Swansea looked to relocate. As Swansea and the Ospreys did not have the capital to invest in a new stadium, the Swansea City Council and a developer-led consortia submitted a proposal for a sustainable "bowl" venue for 20,520 seats on a site to the west of the river on the site of the Morfa Stadium, which the Council owned. It was funded by a 355,000 ft retail park on land to the east of the river. The final value of the development being in excess of £50 million. On 23 July 2005, The Liberty Stadium was officially opened as Swansea faced Fulham in a friendly game.

The Liberty Stadium capacity was 20,532 though has been increased to 20,750. The highest attendance recorded at the stadium came against Arsenal on 31 October 2015 with 20,937 spectators, beating the previous record of 20,845. The stadium has also hosted three Welsh international football matches; the first being a 0–0 draw with Bulgaria in 2006, the second a 2–1 defeat to Georgia in 2008 and a 2–0 win over Switzerland on 7 October 2011. The first international goal to be scored at the Liberty Stadium was a 25-yard effort from Welsh international Jason Koumas.

On 1 July 2012, it was widely reported in national media that Swansea City were beginning the planning phase for expanding the Liberty Stadium by approximately 12,000 seats. This plan would be conditional on a successful second season in the Premier League and could cost up to £15 million; the increase would result in a capacity of approximately 32,000 seats. Later that same year, the board of directors announced that planning applications were to be put forward to the council authority, making the Liberty Stadium the largest sportsclub-owned stadium in Wales.

The Liberty Stadium was renamed the Swansea.com Stadium on 9 August 2021, following a 10-year naming rights agreement.

Rivalries

Swansea City's main rivals are Cardiff City, with the rivalry described as among the most hostile in British football. Matches between these two clubs are known as the South Wales derbies and are usually one of the highlights of the season for both sets of supporters. It was only from the late 1960s that the rivalry became marked. Before then fans of the two clubs often had a degree of affection for their Welsh neighbouring team.

Swansea City's other rivals are Newport County and to a lesser extent Bristol City and Bristol Rovers.  However, Swansea very rarely meet Newport as they are currently separated by two divisions, while the two clubs share a mutual rivalry with Cardiff City.

Swansea have won 36 of the 106 competitive meetings, compared to Cardiff's 43, who also have the biggest result between the two sides with Swansea losing 5–0 in 1965, with a further 27 drawn; neither team had done the double, until the 2021–22 season where Swansea had completed the first ever double in the 110 year rivalry, beating Cardiff 3-0 and 0–4 home and away. Following Swansea City's promotion to the Championship, the clubs were drawn in the League Cup which would be the first meeting between both sides for nine years. Swansea City won the tie with a solitary goal from a deflected free-kick taken by Jordi Gómez. The match saw sets of supporters from both clubs clash with police after the match. The next two league games both finished in 2–2 draws. However, the derby game at Ninian Park was marred with controversy as referee Mike Dean was struck by a coin from a Cardiff City supporter.

In the 2009–10 season, Swansea beat Cardiff 3–2 at the Liberty Stadium in November, before losing 2–1 in Cardiff in April after a late Michael Chopra strike. With Swansea and Cardiff both pushing for promotion to the Premier League, the first derby at the new Cardiff City Stadium, and the first Cardiff win in nine meetings between the sides, was billed as being the biggest South Wales derby of all time, in respect to the league positions of the teams and how close it came to the end of the season. Despite their promising league positions leading up to the derby, neither side gained promotion at the end of that campaign, and so the South Wales derby was once again played out at Championship level during the 2010–11 season – Swansea beating Cardiff 1–0 away with a late winner from then on-loan Marvin Emnes before losing their home game due to a late strike from Craig Bellamy.

Following Swansea's promotion to the Premier League at the end of the 2010–11 season, the South Wales derby was again put on hiatus. It would be two seasons before the sides met once more, this time on the worldwide stage of the Premier League. On 3 November 2013, Cardiff took the bragging rights in the first ever Premier League South Wales derby, enjoying a 1–0 win courtesy of ex-Swan Steven Caulker at the Cardiff City Stadium. The return fixture for that season took place on 8 February 2014 at Swansea's Liberty Stadium, a match in which interim player-manager Garry Monk would make his managerial debut following the sacking of Michael Laudrup. The Swans took revenge for the defeat earlier in the season with a convincing 3–0 win.

The sides met again during the 2019–20 season in the EFL Championship; Swansea won 1–0 in the first fixture at the Liberty Stadium. In the 2020–21 season, Jamal Lowe scored a brace in a 2-0 Swansea win. In October 2021, Swansea won 3–0 against Cardiff. Later in the season, Swansea beat Cardiff 4–0 in the reverse fixture; Swansea became the first side to complete the league double in the derby's 110-year history.

Honours

Swansea City's first trophy was the Welsh Cup, which they won as Swansea Town in 1913. Their first league honour came in 1925, when they won the 1924–25 Football League Third Division South title. Since then Swansea have gone on to win the League Cup once, the Football League Trophy twice and the Welsh Cup a further nine times. They have also qualified for UEFA Cup Winners' Cup seven times and the UEFA Europa League once.

Swansea City's honours include the following:

The Football League
 English second tier (currently Football League Championship)
Promoted (1): 1980–81
Play-off winners (1): 2010–11
 English third tier (currently Football League One)
Winners (3): 1924–25, 1948–49, 2007–08
Promoted (1): 1978–79
 English fourth tier (currently Football League Two)
Winners (1): 1999–2000
Promoted (3): 1969–70, 1977–78, 2004–05
Play-off winners (1): 1987–88
 Welsh Football League – Welsh Top Division (Swansea Town/City Reserves) – Record
Winners (12): 1912–13, 1924–25, 1925–26, 1933–34, 1934–35, 1935–36, 1950–51, 1961–62, 1962–63, 1963–64, 1964–65, 1975–76

Domestic Cup Competition
Football League Cup
Winners (1): 2012–13
 Football League Trophy
Winners (2): 1993–94, 2005–06
 Welsh Cup
Winners (10): 1912–13, 1931–32, 1949–50, 1960–61, 1965–66, 1980–81, 1981–82, 1982–83, 1988–89, 1990–91
 FAW Premier Cup
Winners (2): 2004–05, 2005–06
 Kuala Lumpur FA Dunhill Inter-City Tournament
Winners (1): 1984

Statistics and records

Wilfred Milne holds the record for Swansea appearances, having played 586 matches between 1920 and 1937, closely followed by Roger Freestone with 563 between 1991 and 2004. The player who has won the most international caps while at the club is Ashley Williams with 50 for Wales.

The goalscoring record is held by Ivor Allchurch, with 166 goals, scored between 1947 and 1958 and between 1965 and 1968. Cyril Pearce holds the records for the most goals scored in a season, in 1931–32, with 35 league goals in the Second Division and 40 goals in total.

The club's widest victory margin was 12–0, a scoreline which they achieved once in the European Cup Winners Cup, against Sliema in 1982. They have lost by an eight-goal margin on two occasions, once in the FA Cup, beaten 0–8 by Liverpool in 1990 and once in the European Cup Winners Cup, beaten 0–8 by AS Monaco in 1991. Swansea's 8–1 win against Notts County in the FA Cup in 2018 is their largest winning margin of the competition, and the largest winning margin at their home ground, the Liberty Stadium.

Swansea's home attendance record was set at the fourth-round FA Cup tie against Arsenal on 17 February 1968, with 32,796 fans attending the Vetch Field. The club broke their transfer record to re-sign André Ayew from West Ham United in January 2018 for a fee of £18 million. The most expensive sale is Gylfi Sigurðsson who joined Everton in August 2017 for a fee believed to be £45 million.

Kit manufacturers and sponsors

European record
Swansea City's scores are given first in all scorelines.

Players

Current squad

Out on loan

Under-23s

Retired numbers

Club officials and backroom staff

Club officials

On 22 July 2016, Jason Levien and Steve Kaplan led a consortium of American businessmen who bought a 68% stake in the club.

First-team staff

Academy staff

Managers

There have been forty-four permanent managers (of whom six have been player-managers), and four caretaker managers of Swansea City since the appointment of the club's first professional manager, Walter Whittaker in 1912. In the club's first season, Whittaker led Swansea to their first Welsh Cup win. The club's longest-serving manager, in terms of tenure, was Haydn Green, who held the position for eight years, four months and 14 days, spanning the entirety of World War II. Trevor Morris, who oversaw the most games at Swansea, was also the first manager to lead a Welsh club in Europe, qualifying for the 1961–62 Cup Winners' Cup.

John Toshack, Swansea City's most successful manager with three league promotions and three Welsh Cup wins, led the club to their highest league finish, sixth place in the 1981–82 First Division. Appointed in February 1996, the Dane Jan Mølby became Swansea City's first foreign manager and took Swansea to the 1996–97 Division Three play-off final, only to lose to a last-minute goal. In 2011, Swansea City achieved promotion to the Premier League under Brendan Rodgers, becoming the first Welsh team to play in the division since its formation in 1992. During Swansea City's centenary year (2012–13), the club won the League Cup for the first time under Michael Laudrup, the first major trophy in Swansea's 100-year history.

References

External links

 
 Swans Academy – Official Swansea City academy site
 Swans Commercial – Official Swansea City commercial site

Independent sites
 Swansea City Supporters' Trust
 Planet Swans
 Swansea City at the Premier League official website
 Forza Swansea
 Latest Swansea City News and Video 
 Swans100: 100 Years of Swansea City AFC

 
Football clubs in Wales
English Football League clubs
Association football clubs established in 1912
Sport in Swansea
Welsh football clubs in English leagues
Southern Football League clubs
EFL Trophy winners
1912 establishments in Wales
EFL Cup winners
Premier League clubs